Eyes Wide Shut is a 1999 erotic mystery psychological drama film directed, produced, and co-written by Stanley Kubrick. It is based on the 1926 novella Traumnovelle (Dream Story) by Arthur Schnitzler, transferring the story's setting from early twentieth-century Vienna to 1990s New York City. The plot centers on a doctor (Tom Cruise) who is shocked when his wife (Nicole Kidman) reveals that she had contemplated having an affair a year earlier. He then embarks on a night-long adventure, during which he infiltrates a masked orgy of an unnamed secret society.

Kubrick obtained the filming rights for Dream Story in the 1960s, considering it a perfect text for a film adaptation about sexual relations. He revived the project in the 1990s when he hired writer Frederic Raphael to help him with the adaptation. The film, which was mostly shot in England, apart from some exterior establishing shots, includes a detailed recreation of exterior Greenwich Village street scenes made at Pinewood Studios. The film's production, at 400 days, holds the Guinness World Record for the longest continuous film shoot.

Kubrick died six days after showing the final cut of Eyes Wide Shut to Warner Bros., making it the final film he directed. He reportedly considered it his "greatest contribution to the art of cinema". In order to ensure a theatrical R rating in the United States, Warner Bros. digitally altered several sexually explicit scenes during post-production. This version was premiered on July 13, 1999, before being released on July 16, to moderately positive reactions from film critics. Box office receipts for the film worldwide were about $162 million, making it Kubrick's highest-grossing film. The uncut version has since been released in DVD, HD DVD and Blu-ray Disc formats. Eyes Wide Shut has been included in several lists of the greatest films of the 1990s.

Plot
Dr. William "Bill" Harford and his wife Alice live in New York City with their daughter Helena. At a Christmas party hosted by patient Victor Ziegler, Bill reunites with old medical school classmate Nick Nightingale, who now plays piano professionally. An older Hungarian guest attempts to seduce Alice, while two young models try to seduce Bill. Host Victor interrupts with news of an overdose by Mandy, a young woman he was having sex with. Bill aids in Mandy's recovery.

The next night, while smoking marijuana, Alice and Bill discuss their unfulfilled temptations. Bill isn't jealous of other men's attraction to Alice, believing women to be naturally faithful. Alice admits to fantasizing about a naval officer she met on vacation and considered leaving Bill and Helena. Bill is disturbed before being called to a patient's house. The patient's daughter, Marion, tries to seduce Bill, but he resists.

After leaving Marion's, Bill meets a prostitute named Domino. When Alice calls, he pays Domino for a non-sexual encounter and meets Nick at a jazz club. Nick describes a masked orgy in a mansion outside New York City where he'll play piano blindfolded. Bill offers money to rent a costume from Milich's shop, where he finds Milich's daughter with two men. Bill goes to the mansion and gives the password, discovering a sexual ritual in progress. A masked woman warns him he's in danger. The master of ceremonies unmasks him, but the woman who warned him intervenes. She insists on redeeming him, at a personal cost. Bill is let off with a warning to keep quiet.

Bill comes home feeling guilty and confused, only to find Alice laughing in her sleep. He wakes her up and she tearfully tells him about a dream where she was having sex with a naval officer and many other men, and laughing at the idea of Bill watching. The next day, Bill goes to Nick's hotel, but the desk clerk tells him that Nick left with two dangerous-looking men. Bill returns the costume, but realizes he has misplaced the mask, and learns that Milich has sold his teenage daughter into sex slavery.

In the afternoon, consumed by thoughts of his wife's infidelity, Bill leaves work early and returns to the site of the orgy. At the front gate, he is handed an envelope with a warning to stay away. That evening, Bill tries to call Marion, but hangs up when her fiancé answers. He decides to go to Domino's apartment to consummate their affair, but is met by her roommate, Sally. Although there is sexual tension between them, Sally informs Bill that Domino has just received news that she is HIV-positive. Bill leaves.

After leaving the apartment, Bill is followed by a mysterious figure. He discovers that an ex-beauty queen, Mandy, has died from an overdose and identifies her at the morgue. Later, Ziegler summons him and admits to being a guest at the orgy, revealing that Bill was identified through his association with Nick. Ziegler assures Bill that the secret society only aims to intimidate him into silence but implies that they are capable of taking action if necessary. Bill is concerned about Nick's disappearance and Mandy's death, whom he correctly identifies as the masked orgy participant who sacrificed herself for him. Ziegler claims Nick is safe and that Mandy died from an accidental overdose due to drug addiction.

Bill returns home to find the rented mask on his pillow and confides in his wife, Alice, about the past two days. The next day, they go Christmas shopping with their daughter, and Bill apologizes to Alice. She suggests they do something "as soon as possible," to which Bill asks what she means, and Alice simply responds with one word, "Fuck."

Cast

Production

Development
Eyes Wide Shut developed after Stanley Kubrick read Arthur Schnitzler's Dream Story in 1968, when Kubrick was looking for a project to follow 2001: A Space Odyssey. Kubrick was interested in adapting the story, and with the help of journalist Jay Cocks, bought the filming rights to the novel. For the following decade, Kubrick considered making the Dream Story adaptation a sex comedy "with a wild and somber streak running through it", starring Steve Martin or Woody Allen in the main role. The project was revived in 1994 when Kubrick hired Frederic Raphael to work on the script, updating the setting from early 20th century Vienna to late 20th century New York City. Kubrick invited his friend Michael Herr, who helped write Full Metal Jacket, to make revisions, but Herr declined for fear he would be underpaid and have to commit to a long production.

Adaptation
Arthur Schnitzler's 1926 novella Dream Story is set around Vienna after the turn of the century. The main characters are a couple named Fridolin and Albertina. The couple's home is a typical suburban middle-class home. Like the protagonist of the novel, Schnitzler was Jewish, lived in Vienna, and was a doctor, although he left medicine to write.

Kubrick frequently removed references to the Jewishness of characters in the novels he adapted. In Eyes Wide Shut, Frederic Raphael, who is Jewish, wanted to keep the Jewish background of the protagonists, but Kubrick disagreed and removed details that would identify characters as Jewish. Kubrick determined Bill should be a "Harrison Ford-ish goy" and created the surname of Harford as an allusion to the actor. In the film, Bill is taunted with homophobic slurs. In the novella, the taunters are members of an anti-Semitic college fraternity. In an introduction to a Penguin Classics edition of Dream Story, Raphael wrote that "Fridolin is not declared to be a Jew, but his feelings of cowardice, for failing to challenge his aggressor, echo the uneasiness of Austrian Jews in the face of Gentile provocation."

The novella is set during the Carnival, when people often wear masks to parties. The party that both husband and wife attend at the opening of the story is a Carnival Masquerade ball, whereas the film's story begins at Christmas time.

In the novella, the party (which is sparsely attended) uses "Denmark" as the password for entrance; that is significant in that Albertina had her infatuation with her soldier in Denmark; the film's password is "Fidelio". In early drafts of the screenplay, the password was "Fidelio Rainbow". Jonathan Rosenbaum noted that both passwords echo elements of one member of the couple's behaviour, though in opposite ways. The party in the novella consists mostly of nude ballroom dancing.

In the novella, the woman who "redeems" Fridolin at the party, saving him from punishment, is costumed as a nun, and most of the characters at the party are dressed as nuns or monks; Fridolin himself used a monk costume. This aspect was retained in the film's original screenplay, but was deleted in the filmed version.

The novella makes it clear that Fridolin at this point hates Albertina more than ever, thinking they are now lying together "like mortal enemies". It has been argued that the dramatic climax of the novella is actually Albertina's dream, and the film has shifted the focus to Bill's visit to the secret society's orgy, whose content is more shocking in the film.

The adaptation created a character with no counterpart in the novella: Ziegler, who represents both the high wealth and prestige to which Bill Harford aspires, and a connection between Bill's two worlds (his regular life, and the secret society organizing the ball). Critic Randy Rasmussen interprets Ziegler as representing Bill's worst self, much as in other Kubrick films; the title character in Dr. Strangelove represents the worst of the American national security establishment, Charles Grady represents the worst of Jack Torrance in The Shining, and Clare Quilty represents the worst of Humbert Humbert in Lolita.

More significantly, in the film, Ziegler gives a commentary on the whole story to Bill, including an explanation that the party incident, where Bill is apprehended, threatened, and ultimately redeemed by the woman's sacrifice, was staged. Whether this is to be believed or not, it is an exposition of Ziegler's view of the ways of the world as a member of the power elite.

Casting
When Warner Bros. president Terry Semel approved production, he asked Kubrick to cast a movie star as "you haven't done that since Jack Nicholson [in The Shining]". Kubrick considered casting both Alec Baldwin and Kim Basinger as Bill Harford and Alice Harford. Cruise was in England because his wife Nicole Kidman was there filming The Portrait of a Lady (1996), and the pair eventually decided to visit Kubrick's estate. After that meeting, the director awarded them the roles. Kubrick also managed to make both not commit to other projects until Eyes Wide Shut was completed. Jennifer Jason Leigh and Harvey Keitel each were cast in supporting roles and filmed by Kubrick. Reportedly due to scheduling conflicts, both had to drop out – first Keitel with Finding Graceland, then Leigh with eXistenZ – and they were replaced by Sydney Pollack and Marie Richardson in the final cut. In a 2016 interview, however, Keitel claimed he was actually fired by Kubrick after clashing with him on set.

In 2019, it was revealed that Cate Blanchett had provided the voice of the mysterious masked woman at the orgy party. Actress Abigail Good could not do a convincing American accent, and Cruise and Kidman ended up suggesting Blanchett for the dubbing, which occurred after Kubrick's death.

Filming

Principal photography began in November 1996. Kubrick's perfectionism led to script pages being rewritten on the set with most scenes requiring numerous takes. The shoot went on for much longer than expected; the actress Vinessa Shaw was initially contracted for two weeks but ended up working for two months whilst the actor Alan Cumming, who appears in one scene as a hotel clerk, auditioned six times before the filming process. Due to the relentless nature of the production, the crew became exhausted and were reported to have been impacted by low morale. Filming finally wrapped in June 1998. The Guinness World Records recognized Eyes Wide Shut as the longest constant movie shoot that ran "...for over 15 months, a period that included an unbroken shoot of 46 weeks".

Given Kubrick's fear of flying, the entire film was shot in England. Sound-stage works were completed at London's Pinewood Studios which included a detailed recreation of Greenwich Village. Kubrick's perfectionism went as far as sending workmen to Manhattan to measure street widths and note newspaper vending machine locations. Real New York footage was also shot to be rear projected behind Cruise. Production was followed by a strong campaign of secrecy helped by Kubrick always working with a short team on set. Outdoor locations included Hatton Garden for a Greenwich Village street, Hamleys for the toy store from the film's ending, and Mentmore Towers and Elveden Hall in Elveden, Suffolk, England for the mansion. Larry Smith, who had first served as a gaffer on both Barry Lyndon and The Shining, was chosen by Kubrick to be the film's cinematographer. Wherever possible, Smith made use of available light sources visible in the shots such as lamps and Christmas tree lights, but when this was insufficient he used Chinese paper ball lamps to softly brighten the scene and/or other types of film lighting. The color was enhanced by push processing the film reels (emulsion) which helped bring out the intensity of the color.

Kubrick's perfectionism led him to oversee every visual element that would appear in a given frame, from props and furniture to the color of walls and other objects. One such element were the masks used in the orgy which were inspired by the masked carnival balls visited by the protagonists in the novel. Costume designer Marit Allen explained that Kubrick felt they fit in that scene for being part of the imaginary world and ended up "creat[ing] the impression of menace, but without exaggeration". As many masks as were used in the Venetian carnival were sent to London and Kubrick chose who would wear each piece. The paintings of Kubrick's wife Christiane and his daughter Katherina are featured as decorations.

Nicole Kidman revealed that her explicit scenes with the naval officer, played by Gary Goba, were filmed over three days and that Kubrick wanted them to be 'almost pornographic'.

After shooting had been completed, Kubrick entered a prolonged post-production process and on March 1, 1999, Kubrick showed a cut to Cruise, Kidman and the Warner Bros. executives. The director died six days later.

Music
Jocelyn Pook wrote the original music for Eyes Wide Shut but, like other Kubrick movies, the film was noted for its use of classical music. The opening title music is Shostakovich's Waltz No. 2 from "Suite for Variety Stage Orchestra", misidentified as "Waltz 2 from Jazz Suite". One recurring piece is the second movement of György Ligeti's piano cycle "Musica ricercata". Kubrick originally intended to feature "Im Treibhaus" from Wagner's Wesendonck Lieder, but the director eventually replaced it with Ligeti's tune feeling Wagner's song was "too beautiful". In the morgue scene, Franz Liszt's late solo piano piece, "Nuages Gris" ("Grey Clouds") (1881), is heard. "Rex tremendae" from Mozart's Requiem plays as Bill walks into the café and reads of Mandy's death.

Pook was hired after choreographer Yolande Snaith rehearsed the masked ball orgy scene using Pook's composition "Backwards Priests" – which features a Romanian Orthodox Divine Liturgy recorded in a church in Baia Mare, played backwards – as a reference track. Kubrick then called the composer and asked if she had anything else "weird" like that song, which was reworked for the final cut of the scene, with the title "Masked Ball". Pook ended up composing and recording four pieces of music, many times based on her previous work, totaling 24 minutes. The composer's work ended up having mostly string instruments – including a viola played by Pook herself – with no brass or woodwinds as Pook "just couldn't justify these other textures", particularly as she wanted the tracks played on dialogue-heavy scenes to be "subliminal" and felt such instruments would be intrusive.

Another track in the orgy, "Migrations", features a Tamil song sung by Manickam Yogeswaran, a Carnatic singer. The original cut featured a scriptural recitation from the Bhagavad Gita, which Pook took from a previous Yogeswaran recording. South African Hindu Mahasabha, a Hindu group, protested against the scripture being used, Warner Bros. issued a public apology, and hired the singer to record a similar track to replace the chant.

The party at Ziegler's house features rearrangements of love songs such as "When I Fall in Love" and "It Had to Be You", used in increasingly ironic ways considering how Alice and Bill flirt with other people in the scene. As Kidman was nervous about doing nude scenes, Kubrick stated she could bring music to liven up. When Kidman brought a Chris Isaak CD, Kubrick approved it, and incorporated Isaak's song "Baby Did a Bad, Bad Thing" to both an early romantic embrace of Bill and Alice and the film's trailer.

Themes and interpretations

Genre
The film was described by some reviewers, and partially marketed, as an erotic thriller, a categorization disputed by others. It is classified as such in the book The Erotic Thriller in Contemporary Cinema, by Linda Ruth Williams, and was described as such in news articles about Cruise and Kidman's lawsuit over assertions that they saw a sex therapist during filming. The positive review in Combustible Celluloid describes it as an erotic thriller upon first viewing, but actually a "complex story about marriage and sexuality". High-Def Digest also called it an erotic thriller.

However, reviewing the film at AboutFilm.com, Carlo Cavagna regards this as a misleading classification, as does Leo Goldsmith, writing at notcoming.com, and the review on Blu-ray.com. Writing in TV Guide, Maitland McDonagh writes "No one familiar with the cold precision of Kubrick's work will be surprised that this isn't the steamy erotic thriller a synopsis (or the ads) might suggest." Writing in general about the genre of 'erotic thriller' for CineAction in 2001, Douglas Keesey states that "whatever [Eyes Wide Shut] actual type, [it] was at least marketed as an erotic thriller". Michael Koresky, writing in the 2006 issue of film journal Reverse Shot, writes "this director, who defies expectations at every turn and brings genre to his feet, was  ... setting out to make neither the 'erotic thriller' that the press maintained nor an easily identifiable 'Kubrick film'". DVD Talk similarly dissociates the film from this genre.

Christmas setting
In addition to relocating the story from Vienna in the 1900s to New York City in the 1990s, Kubrick changed the time-frame of Schnitzler's story from Mardi Gras to Christmas. Michael Koresky believed Kubrick did this because of the rejuvenating symbolism of Christmas. Mario Falsetto, on the other hand, notes that Christmas lights allow Kubrick to employ some of his distinct methods of shooting including using source location lighting, as he also did in Barry Lyndon. The New York Times notes that the film "gives an otherworldly radiance and personality to Christmas lights", and critic Randy Rasmussen notes that "colorful Christmas lights  ... illuminate almost every location in the film." Harper'''s film critic, Lee Siegel, believes that the film's recurring motif is the Christmas tree, because it symbolizes the way that "Compared with the everyday reality of sex and emotion, our fantasies of gratification are  ... pompous and solemn in the extreme  ... For desire is like Christmas: it always promises more than it delivers." Author Tim Kreider notes that the "Satanic" mansion-party at Somerton is the only set in the film without a Christmas tree, stating that "Almost every set is suffused with the dreamlike, hazy glow of colored lights and tinsel." Furthermore, he argues that "Eyes Wide Shut, though it was released in summer, was the Christmas movie of 1999." Noting that Kubrick has shown viewers the dark side of Christmas consumerism, Louise Kaplan states that the film illustrates ways in which the "material reality of money" is shown replacing the spiritual values of Christmas, charity, and compassion. While virtually every scene has a Christmas tree, there is "no Christmas music or cheery Christmas spirit." Critic Alonso Duralde, in his book Have Yourself a Movie Little Christmas, categorized the film as a "Christmas movie for grownups", arguing that "Christmas weaves its way through the film from start to finish".

Use of Venetian masks
Historians, travel guide authors, novelists, and merchants of Venetian masks have noted that these have a long history of being worn during promiscuous activities. Authors Tim Kreider and Thomas Nelson have linked the film's usage of these to Venice's reputation as a center of both eroticism and mercantilism. Nelson notes that the sex ritual combines elements of Venetian Carnival and Catholic rites, in particular, the character of "Red Cloak" who simultaneously serves as Grand Inquisitor and King of Carnival. As such, Nelson argues that the sex ritual is a symbolic mirror of the darker truth behind the façade of Victor Ziegler's earlier Christmas party. Carolin Ruwe, in her book Symbols in Stanley Kubrick's Movie 'Eyes Wide Shut', argues that the mask is the prime symbol of the film. Its symbolic meaning is represented through its connection to the characters in the film; as Tim Kreider points out, this can be seen through the masks in the prostitute's apartment and her being renamed as "Domino" in the film, which is a type of Venetian Mask. Unused early poster designs for the film by Kubrick's daughter Katharina used the motif of Venetian masks, but were rejected by the studio because they obscured the faces of the film's two stars.

Release
Marketing
Warner Bros. heavily promoted Eyes Wide Shut, while following Kubrick's secrecy campaign – to the point that the film's press kits contained no production notes, nor even the director's suggestions to Semel regarding the marketing campaign, given one week prior to Kubrick's death. The first footage was shown to theater owners attending the 1999 ShoWest convention in Las Vegas. TV spots featured both Isaak and Ligeti's music from the soundtrack, while revealing little about the movie's plot. The film also appeared on the cover of Time magazine, and on show business programs such as Entertainment Tonight and Access Hollywood.

Box officeEyes Wide Shut opened on July 16, 1999, in the United States. The film topped the week-end box office, with $21.7 million from 2,411 screens. These numbers surpassed the studio's expectations of $20 million, and became both Cruise's sixth consecutive chart topper and Kubrick's highest opening week-end as well as the highest featuring Kidman and Cruise together. Eyes Wide Shut ended up grossing a total of $55,691,208 in the US. The numbers put it as Kubrick's second-highest-grossing film in the country, behind 2001: A Space Odyssey, but both were considered a box office disappointment.

Shortly after its screening at the Venice Film Festival, Eyes Wide Shut had a British premiere on September 3, 1999, at the Warner Village cinema in Leicester Square. The film's wide opening occurred the following week-end, and topped the U.K. charts with £1,189,672.

The international performances for Eyes Wide Shut were more positive, with Kubrick's long-time assistant and brother-in-law Jan Harlan stating that "It was badly received in the Anglo-Saxon world, but it was very well received in the Latin world and Japan. In Italy, it was a huge hit." Overseas earnings of over $105 million led to a $162,091,208 box office run world-wide, turning it into the highest-grossing Kubrick film.

Reception
Critical responseEyes Wide Shut received generally positive reviews from critics. The website's critical consensus reads, "Kubrick's intense study of the human psyche yields an impressive cinematic work." Metacritic gives the film a weighted average score of 68 out of 100 based on 34 reviews, indicating "generally favorable reviews". Over 50 critics listed the film among the best of 1999. French magazine Cahiers du Cinéma named it the best film of the year in its annual "top ten" list. However, audiences polled by CinemaScore gave the film an average grade of "D−" on an A+ to F scale.

In the Chicago Tribune, Michael Wilmington declared the film a masterpiece, lauding it as "provocatively conceived, gorgeously shot and masterfully executed ... Kubrick's brilliantly choreographed one-take scenes create a near-hypnotic atmosphere of commingled desire and dread." Nathan Rabin of The A.V. Club was also highly positive, arguing that "the film's primal, almost religious intensity and power is primarily derived from its multifaceted realization that disobeying the dictates of society and your conscience can be both terrifying and exhilarating. ... The film's depiction of sexual depravity and amorality could easily venture into the realm of camp in the hands of a lesser filmmaker, but Kubrick depicts primal evil in a way that somehow makes it seem both new and deeply terrifying."

Roger Ebert of the Chicago Sun-Times gave the film a score of three and a half stars out of four, writing, "Kubrick's great achievement in the film is to find and hold an odd, unsettling, sometimes erotic tone for the doctor's strange encounters." He praised the individual dream-like atmosphere of the separate scenes, and called the choice of Christmas-themed lighting "garish, like an urban sideshow".

Reviewer James Berardinelli stated that it was arguably one of Kubrick's best films. Along with considering Kidman "consistently excellent", he wrote that Kubrick "has something to say about the causes and effects of depersonalized sex", and praised the work as "thought-provoking and unsettling". Writing for The New York Times, reviewer Janet Maslin commented, "This is a dead-serious film about sexual yearnings, one that flirts with ridicule yet sustains its fundamental eeriness and gravity throughout. The dreamlike intensity of previous Kubrick visions is in full force here."

Some reviewers were unfavorable. One complaint was that the movie's pacing was too slow; while this may have been intended to convey a dream state, critics objected that it made actions and decisions seem laboured. Another complaint was that it did not live up to the expectation of it being a "sexy film" which is what it had been marketed as, thus defying audiences' expectations. Many critics, such as Manohla Dargis of LA Weekly, found the prolific orgy scene to be "banal" and "surprisingly tame". While Kubrick's "pictorial talents" were described as "striking" by Rod Dreher of the New York Post, the pivotal scene was deemed by Stephen Hunter, writing for The Washington Post, as the "dullest orgy [he'd] ever seen". Hunter elaborates on his criticism, and states that "Kubrick is annoyingly offhand while at the same time grindingly pedantic; plot points are made over and over again, things are explained till the dawn threatens to break in the east, and the movie stumbles along at a glacial pace". Owen Gleiberman of Entertainment Weekly complained about the inauthenticity of the New York setting, claiming that the soundstage used for the film's production didn't have "enough bustle" to capture the reality of New York. Paul Tatara of CNN described the film as a "slow-motion morality tale full of hot female bodies and thoroughly uneventful 'mystery'", while Andrew Sarris writing for The New York Observer criticised the film's "feeble attempts at melodramatic tension and suspense". David Edelstein of Slate dismissed it as "estranged from any period I recognize. Who are these people played by Cruise and Kidman, who act as if no one has ever made a pass at them and are so deeply traumatized by their newfound knowledge of sexual fantasies—the kind that mainstream culture absorbed at least half a century ago? Who are these aristocrats whose limos take them to secret masked orgies in Long Island mansions? Even dream plays need some grounding in the real world." J. Hoberman wrote that the film "feels like a rough draft at best."

Lee Siegel from Harper's felt that most critics responded mainly to the marketing campaign and did not address the film on its own terms. Others felt that American censorship took an esoteric film and made it even harder to understand. In his article "Grotesque Caricature", published in Postmodern Culture, Stefan Mattesich praises the film's nuanced caricatured elements, and states that the film's negation of conventional narrative elements is what resulted in its subsequent negative reception.

For the introduction to Michel Ciment's Kubrick: The Definitive Edition, Martin Scorsese wrote: "When Eyes Wide Shut came out a few months after Stanley Kubrick's death in 1999, it was severely misunderstood, which came as no surprise. If you go back and look at the contemporary reactions to any Kubrick picture (except the earliest ones), you'll see that all his films were initially misunderstood. Then, after five or ten years came the realization that 2001 or Barry Lyndon or The Shining was like nothing else before or since." In 2012, Slant Magazine ranked the film as the second greatest of the 1990s. British Film Institute ranked the film at No. 19 on its list of "90 great films of the 1990s". The BBC listed it number 61 in its list of the 100 greatest American films of all time.

Awards and honors

Home mediaEyes Wide Shut was first released in VHS, laserdisc, and DVD on March 7, 2000. The original DVD release corrects technical gaffes, including a reflected crew member, and altering a piece of Alice Harford's dialogue. Most home videos remove the verse that was claimed to be cited from the sacred Hindu scripture Bhagavad Gita (although it was Pook's reworking of "Backwards Priests" as stated above.) In the UK, Warners' 'rated 18' [no video altering] 1999 DVD release was in 4:3 full frame aspect ratio, with a note at the beginning that this was as Kubrick intended to be shown [ratio as shot]. However, the film's length on this UK DVD is only 153 minutes, as opposed to the 159 minutes of other available DVD and Blu-Ray versions. This is due to the transfer being transferred at 25 f.p.s rather than 24 as shot; no actual footage was cut.

On October 23, 2007, Warner Home Video released Eyes Wide Shut in a special edition DVD, plus the HD DVD and Blu-ray Disc formats. This is the first home video release that presents the film in anamorphic 1.78:1 (16:9) format (the film was shown theatrically as soft matted 1.66:1 in Europe and 1.85:1 in the US and Japan). The previous DVD release used a 1.33:1 (4:3) aspect ratio. It is also the first American home video release to feature the uncut version. Although the earliest American DVD of the uncut version states on the cover that it includes both the R-rated and unrated editions, in actuality only the unrated edition is on the DVD.

Controversies
Debate over the film's state of completion
Though Warner Bros. insisted that Kubrick had turned in his final cut before his death, the film was still in the final stages of post-production, which was therefore completed by the studio in collaboration with Kubrick's estate. Some have argued that the work which remained was minor and exclusively technical in nature, allowing the estate to faithfully complete the film based on the director's notes. However, decisions regarding sound mixing, scoring and color-correction would have necessarily been made without Kubrick's input. Furthermore, Kubrick had a history of continuing to edit his films up until the last minute, and in some cases even after initial public screenings, as had been the case with 2001: A Space Odyssey and The Shining.

Writing for Vanity Fair, Kubrick collaborator Michael Herr recalled a phone call from the director regarding the cut that would be screened for the Warner Bros. executives four days before his death:

Garrett Brown, inventor of the Steadicam, has expressed that he considers Eyes Wide Shut to be an unfinished film:

Nicole Kidman, one of the stars of the film, briefly wrote about the completion of the film and the release of the film being at the same time of John F. Kennedy Jr.'s death from her perspective:

Kubrick's opinion
Jan Harlan, Kubrick's brother-in-law and executive producer, reported that Kubrick was "very happy" with the film and considered it to be his "greatest contribution to the art of cinema".

R. Lee Ermey, an actor in Kubrick's film Full Metal Jacket, stated that Kubrick phoned him two weeks before his death to express his despondency over Eyes Wide Shut. "He told me it was a piece of shit", Ermey said in Radar magazine, "and that he was disgusted with it and that the critics were going to 'have him for lunch'. He said Cruise and Kidman had their way with him – exactly the words he used."

According to Todd Field, Kubrick's friend and an actor in Eyes Wide Shut, Ermey's claims do not accurately reflect Kubrick's essential attitude. Field's response appeared in an October 18, 2006 interview with Grouch Reviews:

The polite thing would be to say 'No comment'. But the truth is that  ... let's put it this way, you've never seen two actors more completely subservient and prostrate themselves at the feet of a director. Stanley was absolutely thrilled with the film. He was still working on the film when he died. And he probably died because he finally relaxed. It was one of the happiest weekends of his life, right before he died, after he had shown the first cut to Terry, Tom and Nicole. He would have kept working on it, like he did on all of his films. But I know that from people around him personally, my partner who was his assistant for thirty years. And I thought about R. Lee Ermey for In the Bedroom. And I talked to Stanley a lot about that film, and all I can say is Stanley was adamant that I shouldn't work with him for all kinds of reasons that I won't get into because there is no reason to do that to anyone, even if they are saying slanderous things that I know are completely untrue.

In a reddit "Ask Me Anything" session, Stanley Kubrick's daughter, Katharina Kubrick, claimed that her father was very proud of the film. She also discredited Ermey's claims, saying to a user who asked about Kubrick's alleged comments, "[not to] believe that for a second."

Studio censorship and classification
Citing contractual obligations to deliver an R rating, Warner Bros. digitally altered the orgy for the film's American release by blocking out graphic sexuality using additional figures to obscure the view in order to avoid an adults-only NC-17 rating that would have limited distribution, as some large American theaters and video store operators banned films with that rating. This alteration antagonized both film critics and cinephiles, who argued that Kubrick had never been shy about ratings (A Clockwork Orange was originally given an X-rating). The unrated version of Eyes Wide Shut was released in the United States on October 23, 2007, on DVD, HD DVD and Blu-ray formats.

Roger Ebert heavily criticized the technique of using digital images to mask the action. In his positive review of the film, he said it "should not have been done at all" and it is "symbolic of the moral hypocrisy of the rating system that it would force a great director to compromise his vision, while by the same process making his adult film more accessible to young viewers." Although Ebert has been frequently cited as calling the standard North American R-rated version the "Austin Powers" version of Eyes Wide Shut – referring to two scenes in Austin Powers: International Man of Mystery'' in which, through camera angles and coincidences, full frontal nudity is blocked from view in a comical way – his review stated that this joke referred to an early rough draft of the altered scene, never publicly released.

See also
 List of Christmas films

References

Sources and further reading

External links

 
 
 
 
 
 
 
 

1999 films
1999 drama films
1999 thriller films
1990s American films
1990s Christmas films
1990s English-language films
1990s erotic drama films
1990s erotic thriller films
1990s mystery thriller films
1990s thriller drama films
American Christmas films
American erotic drama films
American erotic thriller films
American mystery thriller films
American thriller drama films
British Christmas films
British erotic drama films
British erotic thriller films
British films set in New York City
British mystery thriller films
British thriller drama films
Censored films
Erotic mystery films
Films about secret societies
Films about sexuality
Films based on Austrian novels
Films based on works by Arthur Schnitzler
Films directed by Stanley Kubrick
Films produced by Stanley Kubrick
Films scored by Jocelyn Pook
Films set in country houses
Films shot at Pinewood Studios
Films shot in Bedfordshire
Films shot in Hampshire
Films shot in Hertfordshire
Films shot in London
Films shot in New York City
Films shot in Norfolk
Films shot in Suffolk
Films with screenplays by Stanley Kubrick
Obscenity controversies in film
Warner Bros. films
1990s British films